Sinoti Sinoti (born 9 September 1985) is a New Zealand-born Rugby Union footballer. He is now retired but played for the Samoa national rugby union team.

Club career
Prior to the start of the 2008–09 season Sinoti began his professional career with French club Toulon, playing in the same team as cousin Jerry Collins. Following a two-year spell in France, including a spell with Castres Olympique, he returned to New Zealand, and played for Hawkes' Bay in the National Provincial competition.

In September 2011 he signed a contract to play with Italian team Aironi. Following the demise of Aironi due to financial problems, he joined up with the replacement Italian representatives in the Pro 12 league, Zebre. He left Zebre at the end of the 2012/13 season, and joined Wellington for the 2013 ITM Cup campaign.

On 24 December 2013, Sinoti signed for English side Newcastle Falcons in the Aviva Premiership for the 2013-14 season. He quickly became a fan favourite due to his footwork, determination and aggression on the pitch, as well as his friendly and joking manner off the pitch.

In January 2018, he was awarded Try of the Week for his week-13 try against London Irish.

He left Newcastle for personal reasons with immediate effect on 16 November 2020.

International career
On 30 October 2010 Sinoti made his test debut for Samoa, against Japan.

An injury sustained on international duty saw Sinoti miss the Rugby World Cup 2015 in England.

In summer 2018, he was recalled to join the Samoa national rugby team that beat Germany to qualify for a place in the Rugby World Cup 2019 in Japan.

References

External links
Newcastle Falcons Profile
Zebre Profile 
Pro 12 Profile 

1985 births
Living people
Rugby union players from Wellington City
New Zealand sportspeople of Samoan descent
Samoan rugby union players
Rugby union wings
Samoa international rugby union players
Zebre Parma players
RC Toulonnais players
Castres Olympique players
Aironi players
Newcastle Falcons players
Samoan expatriate rugby union players
Expatriate rugby union players in Italy
Samoan expatriate sportspeople in Italy